Antonie Hendrikus Catharinus "Han" van Senus (10 October 1900 - 9 December 1976) was a Dutch male water polo player. He was a member of the Netherlands men's national water polo team. He competed with the team at the 1924 Summer Olympics and 1928 Summer Olympics.

He was the brother of water polo player Pieter van Senus, who also competed at the 1924 and 1928 Olympics for the national team.

References

External links
 

1900 births
1976 deaths
Dutch male water polo players
Water polo players at the 1924 Summer Olympics
Water polo players at the 1928 Summer Olympics
Olympic water polo players of the Netherlands
Sportspeople from Rotterdam
20th-century Dutch people